Carol Helen Frick (April 5, 1933 – September 5, 2011) was an American diver. She competed in the women's 3 metre springboard event at the 1952 Summer Olympics.

References

External links
 

1933 births
2011 deaths
American female divers
Olympic divers of the United States
Divers at the 1952 Summer Olympics
Sportspeople from Queens, New York
21st-century American women